The Hero of the People's Republic of Bulgaria was awarded to Bulgarian and foreign citizens for merits in defending Bulgaria and other countries allied to Bulgaria.  Established on 15 June 1948, it was awarded until 1990.  It was the highest honour of the People's Republic of Bulgaria.  Individuals who were named Hero of the People's Republic of Bulgaria were also awarded the Order of Georgi Dimitrov, Bulgaria's highest award at the time.

Notable recipients
Nikita Khrushchev  (Politician) 1964,
General Ivan Mihajlov  (Military/Politician) 6 March 1967,
Tsola Dragoycheva  (Politician) 1968,
Todor Zhivkov  (Politician) 1971 and 1981,
Bojan Balgaranov  (Politician) 1972,
Leonid Brezhnev  (Politician) 1973, 1976 and 1981,
Zachari Zachariev Aka Goranov Semenovich / (Military) 1974.
General Dobri Djurov  (Military/Politician) 1976,
Georgi Ivanov  (Cosmonaut) 1979,
Nikolai Rukavishnikov  (Cosmonaut) 1979,
Aleksei Yeliseyev  (Cosmonaut) 1979,
Marshal Of The Soviet Union Fyodor Tolbukhin  (Military) 1981 (Posthumously),
Elisaveta Bagriana  (Poet) 1983,
Hristo Prodanov  (Mountaineer) 1984 (Posthumously),
Aleksandar Panayotov Aleksandrov  (Cosmonaut) 1988,
Anatoly Solovyev  (Cosmonaut) 1988,
Viktor Savinykh (Cosmonaut) 1988,
Anton Yugov  (Politician) 1989,
Georgi Traykov  (Politician),
Grisha Filipov  (Politician),
Karlo Lukanov  (Politician),
Peko Takov  (Politician),
Sava Ganovski  (Politician).
Yuri Andropov    (politician)
Venko Markovski  (Poet)

References 

Orders, decorations, and medals of Bulgaria
Awards established in 1948
Awards disestablished in 1990
Hero (title)